A deep vein is a vein that is deep in the body.  This contrasts with superficial veins that are close to the body's surface.

Deep veins are almost always beside an artery with the same name (e.g. the femoral vein is beside the femoral artery).  Collectively, they carry the vast majority of the blood.  Occlusion of a deep vein can be life-threatening and is most often caused by thrombosis.  Occlusion of a deep vein by thrombosis is called deep vein thrombosis.

Because of their location deep within the body, operation on these veins can be difficult.

List
Internal jugular vein

Upper limb
Brachial vein
Axillary vein
Subclavian vein

Lower limb
Common femoral vein
Femoral vein
Profunda femoris vein
Popliteal vein
Peroneal vein
Anterior tibial vein
Posterior tibial vein

References

Veins